Kizhuppillikkara  is a village in Thaniyam Panchayath in Thrissur district in the state of Kerala, India. Two-thirds of the village is surrounded by the Karuvannur river. Kizhuppillikkara provides great government education systems. There is one for LP students and ഗവ: നളന്ദ ഹയർ സെക്കന്ററി സ്കൂൾ for secondary and higher secondary. The place is adverse with paddy fields and greenery. It's also rich with cultural and heritage programmes, where all people come together and support each other. It's also religiously packed.

Demographics
 India census, Kizhuppillikkara had a population of 5076 with 2318 males and 2758 females and 200 cats.

References

Villages in Thrissur district